AD 98 (XCVIII) was a common year starting on Monday (link will display the full calendar) of the Julian calendar. At the time, it was known as the Year of the Consulship of Augustus and Traianus (or, less frequently, year 851 Ab urbe condita). The denomination AD 98 for this year has been used since the early medieval period, when the Anno Domini calendar era became the prevalent method in Europe for naming years.

Events

By place

Roman Empire 
 January 1 – Emperor Nerva suffers a stroke during a private audience.
 January 27 – Nerva dies of a fever at his villa in the Gardens of Sallust and is succeeded by his adopted son Trajan. Trajan is the first Roman Emperor born in Italica, near Seville. A brilliant soldier and administrator, he enters Rome without ceremony and wins over the public. Continuing the policies of Augustus, Vespasian and Nerva, he restores the Senate to its full status in the government and begins a form of state welfare aimed at assuring that poor children are fed and taken care of. He has a specific vision of the Empire, which reaches its maximum extent under his rule, and keeps a close watch on finances. Taxes, without any increase, are sufficient during his reign to pay the considerable costs of the budget. The informers used by Domitian to support his tyranny are expelled from Rome. In order to maintain the Port of Alexandria, Trajan reopens the canal between the Nile and the Red Sea.
 Trajan elevates Ladenburg to city status (civitas).

By topic

Arts and sciences 
 Tacitus finishes his Germania (approximate date).

Commerce 
 The silver content of the Roman denarius rises to 93 percent under emperor Trajan, up from 92 percent under Domitian.

Deaths 
 January 27 – Nerva, Roman emperor (b. AD 30)
 Casperius Aelianus, Roman praetorian prefect (b. AD 14)

References 

0098